Changaai Mangalote Ibrahim is an Indian politician and currently the president of Janata Dal (Secular) Karnataka. He was formerly a Indian National Congress (INC) politician. He was a member of the Karnataka Legislative Council. He joined Janata Dal (Secular) and is serving as its State President from 17 April 2022.

Career 
Ibrahim was said to have been first spotted in 1967 when he was 12, by the former Chief Minister of Karnataka S. Nijalingappa, where he was found giving election speeches as part of the campaign for his father's friend, who was contesting on an INC ticket. Nijalingappa entrusted him to another former Chief Minister Veerendra Patil two years later following the split of INC. It was with Patil that Ibrahim later "stayed till [the former's] death."

Upon finishing schooling, Ibrahim stayed with the INC, later shifting to the Janata Parivar alliance, winning his seat at the 1978 legislative assembly election contesting from the latter's Janata Party ticket. He shifted allegiance to INC two years after, only to quit and join the All India Progressive Janata Dal, and then the Janata Dal (Secular). He held portfolios of Civil Aviation and Tourism and Information and Broadcasting in the Deve Gowda and Gujral government, formed respectively in 1996 and 1997 at the centre. After falling out with JD(S)' leadership, he re-joined the INC in 2008.

Controversies

TATA-Singapore Airlines controversy 

In 1997, Ibrahim denied permission for a joint venture between the Tata Group and Singapore Airlines to operate a domestic airline in India. Ibrahim claimed that his reasons were ideological, as he was opposed to foreign investment in the Indian aviation sector. However, at the time, a senior bureaucrat accused the Aviation ministry of being "a malign influence", and there were allegations that Ibrahim was protecting the private carrier Jet Airways. On 15 November 2010, Ratan Tata, the head of the Tata group alleged that, during the 1990s, a minister had asked for a bribe of INR 15 crore (USD 3.3 million approx) to clear a proposed venture with Singapore Airlines, but he had refused to pay the bribe. Although Tata did not name Ibrahim as the offending minister, sections of the media speculated that the minister Tata was referring to may have been Ibrahim. Ibrahim denied the allegation.

Star DTH controversy 

As Information & Broadcasting Minister, Ibrahim denied Star Television permission to operate a Direct to Home (DTH) service in India. It was alleged that Ibrahim had overruled other ministers and was protecting the interests of Star's rival Zee Television, who he granted permission to operate a DTH network.

Voting bribery controversy 

On 1 September 2010, while campaigning in his home state, Ibrahim alleged that Katta Subramanya Naidu, a politician from the rival Bharatiya Janata Party was bribing voters. However, Ibrahim reportedly told voters: "Take the stack of currency given by Katta Subramanya Naidu without any second thought but do not fail to cast vote for Congress.". The Deccan Herald accused Ibrahim of making a "mockery out of democracy."

References 

Living people
Rajya Sabha members from Karnataka
Civil aviation ministers of India
Indian National Congress politicians from Karnataka
Janata Dal politicians
Members of the Karnataka Legislative Council
1952 births
Janata Party politicians
Janata Dal (Secular) politicians